During the 2010-11 football season, Dinamo will play its 60th Kategoria Superiore season in the club's existence.

Club

Management

Kit

|
|

Other information

Squad

First team

Competitions

Albanian Supercup

Kategoria Superiore

League table

Results summary

Results by round

Matches

Relegation play-off

Albanian Cup

Final

UEFA Champions League

Second qualifying round

References 

FK Dinamo Tirana seasons
Dinamo Tirana